Maurice Schumann (10 April 1911 – 9 February 1998) was a French politician, journalist, writer, and hero of the Second World War who served as Minister of Foreign Affairs under Georges Pompidou from 22 June 1969 to 15 March 1973. Schumann was a member of the Christian democratic Popular Republican Movement.

The son of an Alsatian Jewish father and Roman Catholic mother, he studied at the Lycée Janson-de-Sailly and the Lycée Henri-IV. He converted to his mother's faith in 1937. He once said of France's fate when suffering the Allied bombing raids, '....and now we are reduced to the most atrocious fate: to be killed without killing back, to be killed by friends without being able to kill our enemies'. During the Second World War he broadcast news reports and commentaries into France on the BBC French Service some 1,000 times in programs such as Honneur et Patrie. He was called by some the "voice of France".

During a meeting of the foreign ministers of the European Community in 1969, he stated France's conditions for Britain joining the community on its third application, i.e. questions of agricultural finance had to be settled first. Schumann died on 9 February 1998 in Paris, aged 86.

References

External links 
 Interview about the French nuclear program for the WGBH series, War and Peace in the Nuclear Age
 ordredelaliberation.fr

1911 births
1998 deaths
Politicians from Paris
French Roman Catholics
Converts to Roman Catholicism
Popular Republican Movement politicians
Union of Democrats for the Republic politicians
Rally for the Republic politicians
French Foreign Ministers
Members of the Constituent Assembly of France (1945)
Members of the Constituent Assembly of France (1946)
Deputies of the 1st National Assembly of the French Fourth Republic
Deputies of the 2nd National Assembly of the French Fourth Republic
Deputies of the 3rd National Assembly of the French Fourth Republic
Deputies of the 1st National Assembly of the French Fifth Republic
Deputies of the 2nd National Assembly of the French Fifth Republic
Deputies of the 3rd National Assembly of the French Fifth Republic
Deputies of the 4th National Assembly of the French Fifth Republic
French Senators of the Fifth Republic
Senators of Nord (French department)
Vice-presidents of the Senate (France)
French contract bridge players
Lycée Henri-IV alumni
Lycée Janson-de-Sailly alumni
University of Paris alumni
Members of the Académie Française
Companions of the Liberation
Honorary Knights Grand Cross of the Order of St Michael and St George
Sportspeople from Nord (French department)
French people of German descent